Prvi Glas Srbije (English: The First Voice of Serbia) is a Serbian television music competition that debuted on Prva Srpska Televizija in 2011. So far, two seasons have been broadcast.

Format
The concept is that an auditionee performs in front of three judges. After an act performs, the judges give comments and depending on how they feel about the performance, they press a button that lights a red or a green light. If an acts gets two or three green lights, they advance to the next phase of the competition, but if they get two or more red lights, a trapdoor opens and the auditionee falls through it, which also ends their time on the show.
After the auditions are done, judges call all of the contestants who have gone through to perform again to select more acts that will advance in the competition. After this, judges figure out who will go to the next phase and who can mentor and get the best out of them. At this phase, acts are divided in groups and perform in front of their mentors.

The judging panel is Vlado Georgiev, Aleksandra Radović and Saša Milošević, with Andrija Milošević and Marija Kilibarda as presenters.

References

External links 
 Official site - Prva.rs

Serbian talent shows
Serbian reality television series
2011 Serbian television series debuts
2010s Serbian television series
2013 Serbian television series endings
Prva Srpska Televizija original programming